The Gomukhi River foot hill of Kalvarayan Hills which comes from  Gomuki Dam from Kallakurichi District  Tamil Nadu. It is a tributary of the Vellar

A reservoir was built in the valley of the river in 1965.

References

Rivers of Tamil Nadu
Rivers of India